Irakleia (before 1926: Τζουμαγιά - Tzoumagia) is a municipality in the Serres regional unit, Central Macedonia, Greece. Population 21,145 (2011). "Upper Dzhumaya" is modern Blagoevgrad, located in Bulgaria. In the Serres area, during Ottoman times, Aromanians settled in modern Irakleia. Some Aromanians still live in the city today, with Bulgarian researcher Vasil Kanchov even saying that, as of when he visited the town, the 1250 Aromanians in Irakleia "were the wealthiest of all inhabitants".

Municipality
The municipality Irakleia was formed at the 2011 local government reform by the merger of the following 3 former municipalities, that became municipal units:
Irakleia
Skotoussa
Strymoniko

The municipality has an area of 451.499 km2, the municipal unit 195.216 km2.

References

External links
Official website of the Municipality of Irakleia

Municipalities of Central Macedonia
Populated places in Serres (regional unit)
Aromanian settlements in Greece